The men's coxed pair competition at the 1936 Summer Olympics in Berlin took place at Grünau on the Langer See. It was held from 12 to 14 August. There were 12 boats (36 competitors) from 12 nations, with each nation limited to a single boat in the event. It was twice the highest number of boats that had previously competed in an Olympic tournament (6 boats in 1928). The event was won by the German team, rowers Gerhard Gustmann and Herbert Adamski and coxswain Dieter Arend, in the nation's debut in the event. Italy earned its first medal in the event since 1924 with silver by Almiro Bergamo, Guido Santin, and cox Luciano Negrini. France extended its podium streak to three Games with bronze by Marceau Fourcade, Georges Tapie, and cox Noël Vandernotte.

Background

This was the sixth appearance of the event. Rowing had been on the programme in 1896 but was cancelled due to bad weather. The men's coxed pair was one of the original four events in 1900, but was not held in 1904, 1908, or 1912. It returned to the programme after World War I and was held every Games from 1924 to 1992, when it (along with the men's coxed four) was replaced with the men's lightweight double sculls and men's lightweight coxless four.

Five of the 12 competitors from the 1932 coxed pair event returned: Poland's silver medal team, Jerzy Braun, Janusz Ślązak, and cox Jerzy Skolimowski; and two members of Brazil's fourth-place boat, José Ramalho and cox Estevam Strata.

Denmark, Germany, Hungary, Japan, and Yugoslavia each made their debut in the event. France made its sixth appearance, the only nation to have competed in all editions of the event to that point. Belgium was the only nation to have competed previously but not in 1936.

Competition format

The coxed pair event featured three-person boats, with two rowers and a coxswain. It was a sweep rowing event, with the rowers each having one oar (and thus each rowing on one side). The tournament featured three rounds: semifinals, a repechage, and a final. The course used the 2000 metres distance that became the Olympic standard in 1912. The competition introduced the 6-boat heat.

 Semifinals: There were 2 semifinals, each with 6 boats. The winner of each heat advanced directly to the final; the remaining boats competed in the repechage.
 Repechage: There were 2 repechage heats, each with 5 boats (before a withdrawal). The top two boats in each heat advanced to the final, with the rest of the boats eliminated.
 Final: A single final, with 6 boats.

Schedule

Results

Semifinals

The first boat of each heat qualified for the final; the remainder went to the repechage.

Semifinal 1

Semifinal 2

Repechage

The first two in each heat qualified for the final.

Repechage heat 1

Repechage heat 2

Final

Results summary

References

External links
 Official Olympic Report

Rowing at the 1936 Summer Olympics